Satish K. Tripathi is an Indian-American academic, a computer scientist and academic administrator. He is the first foreign-born president of the University at Buffalo (UB), the flagship of the State University of New York (SUNY) system. Previously, he served as provost of University at Buffalo from 2004 to 2011. From 1997-2004, Tripathi served as dean of the Bourns College of Engineering at University of California, Riverside.

Early Life and Education 
Tripathi was raised in Village Patna in northeast India and graduated at the top of his class from Banaras Hindu University (BHU). He holds a doctorate in computer science from the University of Toronto, as well as three master’s degrees—one in computer science from the University of Toronto and two in statistics from the University of Alberta and BHU.

Career
Coming to the United States in 1978, Tripathi joined the faculty of the Department of Computer Science at the University of Maryland, where his 19-year tenure included serving as chair from 1988-95.  While on sabbatical at the University of Maryland, he also held visiting professorships at the University of Paris-Sud in France and the University of Erlangen-Nuremberg in Germany.  From 1997-2004, Tripathi served as dean of the Bourns College of Engineering at the University of California-Riverside, where he nearly quadrupled the number of students and tripled the number of faculty at that institution and led its rise from an unranked program to a position in the upper half of the U.S. News and World Report Best Engineering Graduate Schools rankings. 

Tripathi joined the University at Buffalo in 2004, serving as UB’s provost and executive vice president for academic affairs until his appointment as president in 2011.  As provost, Tripathi led the recruitment of many prominent faculty to the university and oversaw a significant increase in the number of faculty hired to develop and enhance strengths in key areas of research and scholarly activity.  As a result, the university achieved substantial increases in research expenditures and federally awarded research grants, putting UB in league with the top national research universities in the United States.  

Under Tripathi’s leadership, the academic profile of UB’s undergraduate and graduate students also has improved significantly. He led a number of efforts to enrich the educational experiences of UB undergraduate students by introducing programs designed to provide them with opportunities to engage in learning and research with UB’s top faculty.  He also oversaw the development of innovative “living-learning environments” constructed as part of “Building UB,” the university’s comprehensive physical plan.

Tripathi led a strategic planning process for UB’s international programs that has led to significant expansion of the university’s international presence and the continued globalization of its three Western New York campuses.  He signed a memorandum of understanding in 2005 with Indian Prime Minister Manmohan Singh to establish the Indo-U.S. Inter-University Collaborative Initiative in Higher Education and Research, which has led to a significant partnership between UB and Amrita University.  UB’s educational programs in Singapore, in partnership with the Singapore Institute of Management, also have experienced significant growth under Tripathi’s leadership.

Tripathi was one of the principal creators of the UB 2020 long-range academic plan, and has led the university to achieve significant growth in research and scholarly activity, enhanced student quality and diversity, and an expanded international presence.  Today, Tripathi is positioning UB to situate itself among the nation’s top 25 public research universities within the decade.

Within his first year as president, the university celebrated a number of major milestones, including the passage of the NYSUNY 2020 legislation that led to historic reforms for UB and the SUNY system of public higher education as a whole. Since Tripathi assumed the presidency in 2011, the university has also opened six major building projects on its three campuses—including the new $375 million building for the Jacobs School of Medicine and Biomedical Sciences on the Buffalo Niagara Medical Campus that is positioned as the hub of a thriving life sciences community in Buffalo—and celebrated a $40 million bequest that is the largest gift in university history. The university also received designation of a New York State Center of Excellence in Materials Informatics, positioning the university at the forefront of the rapidly expanding field of advanced materials.

A prolific scholar, Tripathi has made significant contributions to the field of computer science, publishing more than 200 scholarly papers, supervising more than 30 doctoral and postdoctoral students and serving on program committees of numerous international conferences. The former editor of several top-tier scientific journals, he is a founding editorial board member of IEEE Pervasive Computing.

Civic and professional involvement
A leader in the national higher education community, Tripathi serves on the College Football Playoff Board of Managers and has served as chair of the Mid-American Conference Council of Presidents as well as on the boards of the NCAA Division I and NCAA Board of Governors. In addition, he has served on the boards of the Association of American Universities, the Association of Public and Land-Grant Universities, the Council for Higher Education Accreditation and as a member of the Reimagine NY Commission. In 2011, Tripathi was appointed the inaugural co-chair of the Western New York Regional Economic Development Council, a position he held until 2017.  Further, Tripathi is a fellow of both the Institute of Electrical and Electronics Engineers (IEEE) and the American Association for the Advancement of Science.

Awards 
In 2006, Dr. Tripathi was awarded the honorary doctorate of sciences from the prestigious Indian Institute of Information Technology, Allahabad, and in 2016 he received an honorary doctorate of law from Brock University in Ontario, Canada. He also has been honored with the 2009 Distinguished Alumnus Award from Banaras Hindu University.

Personal life
Tripathi is a resident of Amherst, New York. He and his wife, Kamlesh, have two adult sons, Manish and Aashish.

References

External links
 UB Office of the President: About Satish K. Tripathi

American computer scientists
Banaras Hindu University alumni
Leaders of the University at Buffalo
Scientists from Buffalo, New York
University of Toronto alumni
University of Alberta alumni
University at Buffalo faculty
University of Maryland, College Park faculty
University of California, Riverside faculty
Living people
American academics of Indian descent
Year of birth missing (living people)